The 1989 Women's Intercontinental Cup was a third edition of the FIH Women's Intercontinental Cup and served as a qualifier for the 1994 Women's Hockey World Cup. This tournament was held at the Major Dhyan Chand National Stadium in New Delhi, India from 1 until 12 November 1989. Twelve nations took part, and they were divided into two groups of six in the preliminary round. The top two teams from each group advanced to the semifinals. The third and fourth-placed teams went to the 5th-8th placement semifinals, and the fifth and sixth-placed teams went to the 9th-12th.

The top four teams qualified for the 1990 Women's Hockey World Cup.

Squad 

 China
 Players: Chen Mingzhu, Qi Wen, Cai Donghong, Yang Huiping, Wu Yanzhen, Hong Ping Ding (GK)

 Ireland
 Coach: George Tracy
 Players: Glenda McKee, Mary Barnwell, Fiona Breheny (GK), Susie Kinley, Caroline Fusco, Jackie Burns, Mary Logue, Fiona Manning

 Scotland
 Coach: Bill Joss
 Players: Catherine Stirling, Pauline Lyon, Gillian Messenger, Moira MacLeod (Captain), Alison Ramsay, Caroline Howard, Susan Fraser, Sue Lawrie (GK), Wendy Fraser

 South Korea
 Head coach: Park Young Jo
 Players: Lim Gae Sook, Hea Sook Yang

 The United States
 Head coach:  Boudewijn Castelijn 
 Assistant coach: Cheryl Murtagh
 Players: Diane Madl, Deb Bricked, Lori Bruney, Pam Austin, Sandi Costigan, Tracey Fuchs, Tracey Griesbaum, Sheryl Johnson (Vice-captain), Donna Lee, Diane Loosbrock, Barbara Marois (Captain), Marcia Pankratz (Vice-captain), Janet Ryan, Patty Shea, Elizabeth Tchou, Mary Koboldt Tracey

Preliminary round

Group A

Group B 

<ref name=

Final round

Semifinals 

 9th - 12th placement

 5th - 8th placement

 1st - 4th placement

Finals 

 11th place match

 9th place match

 7th place match

 5th place match

 Third-place match

Lim Gae Sook is a top scorer with 12 goals before the final.

 Final match

Final standings
 *
 *
 *
 *

References

External links
todor66.com

1989
1989 in women's field hockey
1989 in Indian women's sport
1989 Women's Intercontinental Cup
1989 in Indian sport
November 1989 events in India